Manulea minor is a moth of the family Erebidae. It is found in the Russian Far East (southern Primorye) and Japan.

References

Moths described in 1955
Lithosiina
Moths of Japan